Służew, historically until 16th century known as Służewo, is a residential neighbourhood, and an area of the Municipal Information System, in the city of Warsaw, Poland, located within the district of Mokotów.

Landmarks and transport
Służew has one, central, metro station of the same name on the M1 metro line.  

The E30 highway is immediately beyond its southern and south-eastern border.  The country's 40% of traffic-handling and main regional airport, Warsaw Chopin Airport (Lotnisko Chopina w Warszawie) with its runways running to the south and south-east rather than east-west is 2 km west of its centre.

Amenities
Służew has one main park, Park Dolinka Służewiecka, marking its long southern crescent border with a line of ornamental lakes in its centre along a stream.  

Two schools take up spacious sites with many buildings and sports facilities on the straight thoroughfare across the north of the district, Wałbrzyska, a further school (nr. 49) is on this street but without playing fields with many neat buildings arranged around a courtyard by the district's own long streets named after J.S. Bach and Wolfgang Amadeus Mozart:
Szkoła Podstawowa nr. 46 
Szkoła Podstawowa nr. 107 
Szkoła Podstawowa Niepubliczna nr. 49

Służew New Cemetery
The important cemetery to Warsaw Służew New Cemetery (Służew Cemetery or Wałbrzyska Street Cemetery) is a partly tree-covered, well-tended site that occupies land approximately of the size of the schools combined and contains the elaborate tombs and ordinary graves of people of the region (Masovian Voivodeship). Notable people include:
Waldemar Baszanowski, Olympic gold medallist (1964, 1968) and winner of five World Championships and five silver medals, a total of 10, more than any other weightlifter to date.

Służew Old Cemetery
The Służew Old Cemetery is located next to the presbytery of the St Catherine's Church at the Fosa Street.

Notes

External links
 

Neighbourhoods of Mokotów